Ques is one of 24 parishes (administrative divisions) in Piloña, a municipality within the province and autonomous community of Asturias, in northern Spain.

The population is 159 (INE 2006).

References

Parishes in Piloña